Virus is a 1999 American science fiction horror film directed by visual effects artist John Bruno and starring Jamie Lee Curtis, William Baldwin and Donald Sutherland. Based on the comic book of the same name by Chuck Pfarrer, it tells the story of a ship beset by a malevolent extraterrestrial entity that seeks to turn humanity into cyborg slaves.

The film was promoted with a line of action figures and a tie-in video game. It turned out to be a critical and commercial flop, but over time gained a cult following.

Plot

Akademik Vladislav Volkov, a Russian research vessel in the South Pacific, communicates with the orbiting space station Mir. A large energy source traveling through space strikes Mir, killing the cosmonauts and beaming itself down to Volkov. The electrical surge takes over the ship and attacks the crew.

Seven days later, the tugboat Sea Star, captained by alcoholic Robert Everton (Donald Sutherland), loses its uninsured cargo while sailing through a typhoon. Sea Star'''s crew, led by navigator and ex-Navy officer Kelly Foster (Jamie Lee Curtis) and engineer Steve Baker (William Baldwin), discover the engine room taking on water. When Sea Star takes refuge in the eye of the storm to make repairs, Volkov appears on their radar. Realizing that it could be worth millions in salvage, Everton orders his crew aboard.

On Volkov, most of the electronics have been destroyed and the Russian crew are seemingly missing. Everton orders Steve to help a fellow crewman, Squeaky (Julio Oscar Mechoso), restore power to the ship. Immediately afterward, the ship's anchor drops on its own, sinking Sea Star with deckhand Hiko (Cliff Curtis) and first mate J.W. Woods, Jr. (Marshall Bell) on board. Steve leaves Squeaky to guard the engine room, where he is lured to his death by a robotic, spider-like creature. Steve rescues an injured Hiko, while Woods comes out unscathed.

As Foster treats Hiko in the sick bay, Chief Science Officer Nadia Vinogradova (Joanna Pacuła)—the sole surviving member of Volkovs crew—shoots at the crew and is subdued by Steve. Nadia is hysterical about "it" needing power to travel through the ship and implores the crew to shut down the generators. She attacks Everton and Foster, who subdues her and takes her to the bridge. Steve, Woods, and crewman Richie Mason (Sherman Augustus) go to the engine room to look for Squeaky, but instead stumble upon an automated workshop producing more of the strange robots.

The three are attacked by the robots and what appears to be a gun-wielding Russian crew member. The Russian is revealed to be a cyborg, but the three bring it down with salvaged munitions from the ship's small arms locker and take its seemingly dead body to the bridge. Nadia explains that the sentient electrical energy beamed from the Mir took over the ship eight days prior, scanned the ship's computers to find information on killing humans, then used the automated workshops to convert Volkov'''s crew into cyborgs; the one brought to the bridge was the ship's captain and Nadia's husband.

As the storm resumes, the crew head for the computer room. On the way, they are ambushed by a converted Squeaky and a giant robot that kills Woods. The survivors barricade themselves in the communications room, where Richie sends out a mayday; however, Everton shoots out the radio, unwilling to give up his salvage. Foster punches Everton and removes him from command. Richie uses the computers to talk to the alien (credited as The Intelligence); it tells them that it is "aware" and sees mankind as a "virus" which it plans to use as "spare parts." This drives Richie insane, causing him to gun down Squeaky and flee. When the remaining crew leave the room, Everton takes the opportunity to talk to the Intelligence, which recognizes him as the "dominant lifeform."

The crew discovers that the Intelligence has moved Volkovs computer elsewhere in the ship. Realizing that the ship is moving, they return to the bridge by going outside, where Hiko is lost to the typhoon. Meanwhile, Everton is guided to one of the workshops, where he makes a bargain with the Intelligence. Foster identifies Lord Howe Island as Volkovs destination, with Nadia surmising that the Intelligence wishes to seize a British intelligence station from which it could seize control of the world's military forces. As they decide to sink Volkov, the survivors are confronted by the now-cyborg Everton, which they defeat with a thermite hand grenade. They empty the ship's fuel tanks and set explosive charges.

Foster, Steve and Nadia run into Richie. A giant robot (piloted by the Intelligence) suddenly appears and attacks Nadia, Richie and Steve. The Intelligence captures Foster and tortures her for the location of the detonator. A mortally wounded Richie informs Steve that he prepared a jury-rigged ejection seat that can be used for escape. Nadia and Steve rescue Foster, and Nadia sacrifices herself by shooting a flaregun at nearby gas tanks to kill the Intelligence. Foster and Steve make it out safely by using Richie's ejection seat, which triggers an explosion and sinks Volkov, causing the sentient electricity to disperse in the seawater. Foster and Steve are rescued by a U.S. naval ship.

Cast
 Jamie Lee Curtis as Kelly "Kit" Foster
 William Baldwin as Steve Baker
 Donald Sutherland as Captain Robert Everton
 Joanna Pacuła as Nadia Vinogradova
 Marshall Bell as J.W. Woods Jr.
 Sherman Augustus as Richie Mason
 Cliff Curtis as Hiko
 Julio Oscar Mechoso as "Squeaky"
 Yuri Chervotin as Colonel Kominsky 
 Keith Flippen as Captain Lonya Rostov
 Levan Uchaneishvili as Alexi

Production
An international co-production film between The United States, United Kingdom, Japan, France and Germany. The film was mostly shot in Newport News, Virginia, on a ship anchored in the James River. A horizontal bar on the ship was raised and lowered to conceal the horizon line, making it appear the ship was far out at sea. The ship used as the Akademik Vladislav Volkov was the retired Missile Range Instrumentation Ship . One of the ship's satellite dish antennas was intentionally damaged for the film's final scene where the ship was destroyed. Some of the Cyrillic lettering applied for the film was still visible on the hull before it was sunk on May 27, 2009.

Several lines of dialogue in Virus were improvised. For instance, Richie's emphatic comment that the Volkov has a "fucked-up" antenna resulted from the actor's surprise at the condition of the Vandenberg.

Reception
Virus was a critical and commercial flop, grossing less than half of its budget and earning negative reviews. Based on 49 reviews, the film holds a 12% approval rating on Rotten Tomatoes, with an average rating of 3.4/10. The site's consensus states: "Despite its great special effects, this movie's predictability greatly undermines its intensity." On Metacritic, it holds a weighted average score of 19 out of 100 based on 17 reviews, indicating "overwhelming dislike".

Most critics found the film derivative and unoriginal.

Reviewers pointed out similarities with the 1998 film Deep Rising. Roger Ebert gave Virus an even lower rating than Deep Rising, which he considered one of the worst films of 1998 and placed on his most-hated list. Many echoed his complaint about the underlit cinematography.

Jamie Lee Curtis herself did not think highly of the film. In an IGN.com interview, Curtis had the following to say about Virus: "That would be the all time piece of shit...It's just dreadful... That's the only good reason to be in bad movies. Then when your friends have [bad] movies you can say 'Ahhhh, I've got the best one.' I'm bringing Virus". Curtis also stated in the commentary track of the 2014 Shout Factory Blu-ray release of Halloween H20 that she tried to get the director (John Bruno) fired because of how bad she thought the film was."

Audiences polled by CinemaScore gave the film an average grade of "C" on an A+ to F scale.

Merchandise
A line of action figures, the Virus Collector Series, was developed by ReSaurus to promote the film. The line included figures of Foster, Baker, Richie, Captain Everton, Captain Alexi, Squeaky and the Goliath Machine (the Goliath set also included a Nadia figure). The captains and Squeaky were built with their cyborg implants, with parts included to restore their human appearance. All of the sets, excluding Goliath and Nadia's, included one or more firearms for their figure. Goliath also featured three sound clips of his lines from the film.

A Europe-only tie-in game, Virus: It is Aware, was also developed and published by Cryo Interactive for the Sony PlayStation. The game is a survival-horror title akin to Resident Evil in concept and to Tomb Raider in control. The game had little to do with the film, apart from the introduction and ending cinematics, which feature creatures infesting a ship and a space station, respectively. The actual game follows a female police officer, Joan, trapped in an infested hotel along with her partner Sutter. The game is generally poorly regarded and has since fallen into obscurity.

The original comics were re-released in graphic novel format with alternate cover artwork based on the film's climax.

See also
 List of films featuring space stations

References

External links

1999 films
1999 horror films
1990s science fiction horror films
American robot films
American science fiction horror films
American survival films
British science fiction horror films
British science fiction films
Cyborg films
French science fiction horror films
French science fiction films
German science fiction horror films
German horror films
Japanese science fiction horror films
Japanese science fiction films
1990s English-language films
Films based on Dark Horse Comics
Films set on ships
Films shot in North Carolina
Films shot in Virginia
Mutual Film Company films
Universal Pictures films
Films scored by Joel McNeely
Dark Horse Entertainment films
Live-action films based on comics
Films directed by John Bruno (special effects)
Films produced by Gale Anne Hurd
Seafaring films
1999 directorial debut films
1990s American films